The European Pitch and putt Championship is the team championship promoted by the European Pitch and Putt Association (EPPA), and was first held in 1999.

European championships 
The champions so far are:

See also
European Pitch and Putt Association

References

External links 
European Pitch and putt Association website

Pitch and putt competitions
Recurring sporting events established in 1999
1999 establishments in Europe